Sheep's Banks is a  biological Site of Special Scientific Interest north of Wootton in Oxfordshire.

This steeply sloping site is species-rich grassland which is traditionally managed. An ancient hedge runs the length of the site and a small stream runs along the downward side. Flora include five species of orchid, including bee, pyramidal and green-winged.

The site is private land with no public access.

References

 
Sites of Special Scientific Interest in Oxfordshire